Kirill Romanov may refer to:

Kirill Romanov (association football), Russian footballer
Kirill Romanov (beach soccer), Russian beach soccer player